CHN may stand for:

 China's country code
 People's Republic of China's ISO 3166-1 alpha-3 and IOC country code
 Republic of China's IOC country code 1932-1956, now TPE
 Canadian Health Network
 Cheshunt railway station, Hertfordshire, National Rail station code
 CHN analyzer, measuring carbon, hydrogen, and nitrogen
 City Hindus Network, London, UK
 Anglican religious orders
 Community of the Holy Name, an Anglican religious order for women in England, Lesotho and South Africa
 Community of the Holy Name (Australia), an Anglican religious order for women in Australia, unrelated to the English order
 Jeonju Airport, South Korea, IATA airport code
 Chemical formula of hydrogen cyanide and hydrogen isocyanide
 Climate Heritage Network